Gyalidea goughensis is a species of crustose lichen in the family Gomphillaceae. Found in the Tristan da Cunha–Gough Island, it was described as a new species in 2010 by Norwegian lichenologist Dag Øvstedal. The type specimen was collected from the inland of The Admirals (a small satellite island east of Gough Island). The species is known only from the type locality.

The lichen has a thin, green-grey crust-like thallus that grows in bark fissures. Its ascospores, which number eight per ascus, are 3-septate and measure about 10 by 2.5 μm. No secondary chemicals were detected using thin-layer chromatography.

References

Ostropales
Lichen species
Lichens described in 2010
Lichens of Tristan da Cunha